Mimis Traiforos (15 October 1913, in Piraeus – 26 March 1998, in Athens) was a Greek writer and lyricist.

In 1934 he collaborated as an actor with Attik and later in 1940 with singer Sofia Vembo, his future wife. Some of Vembo's best successes were of his lyrics. Also, notable composers of the era collaborated with him, such as Giorgos Mouzakis, Manos Hatzidakis, Michalis Souyioul and Kostas Giannidis.

He worked also as a theatrical writer and wrote many revues.

He died in 1998.

References

1913 births
1998 deaths
Greek songwriters
Greek lyricists
Musicians from Piraeus